No Man's Land is a 1985 film directed, written and co-produced by Alain Tanner, about smuggling on the French-Swiss border.

Plot
Jean (Jean-Philippe Écoffey), a young Swiss whose watchmaking skills no longer prove useful in the real world, dawdles his time away either in his parents' farm or in Lucie's restaurant-bar. He sleeps with Lucie (Marie-Luce Felber) but doesn't love her, as he becomes smitten with an insecure Algerian woman (Betty Berr) who travels between France and Switzerland daily for work. Meanwhile, Paul (Hugues Quester), a mechanic in his father's automobile shop with dreams of immigrating to Canada, periodically smuggles items across the border to make money, and gets Jean to help him out on occasions. Gradually, the police begin to frequent the nightclub run by Paul's lover Madeleine to inquire about his whereabouts. Paul gets an offer to smuggle a large amount of gold, and knowing the police are hot on his trail, decides to take the risk "for the last time" along with a hesitant Jean.

Review
Vincent Caby of the New York Times wrote that the film is "completely humorless and cold, memorable only for their picturesque landscapes and cloud formations."

Awards and nominations
The film was nominated for the Golden Lion at the 1985 42nd Venice International Film Festival.

References

External links

Swiss drama films
1980s French-language films
French-language Swiss films
1980s French films